Adani Enterprises Limited is an Indian multinational publicly listed holding company and a part of Adani Group. It is headquartered in Ahmedabad and primarily involved in mining and trading of coal and iron ore. Through its various subsidiaries, it also has business interests in airport operations, edible oils, road, rail and water infrastructure, data centers, and solar manufacturing, among others.

History 
The company was incorporated in 1993 under the name Adani Exports Limited. It mainly deals with the group's integrated resources management, power trading, and natural resources businesses on a standalone basis. Its general purpose is to act as an in-house incubator for Adani Group's new businesses until they become self-sustainable.

Through its various subsidiaries, Adani Enterprises is involved in edible oils and staple foods, airport operations, solar PV manufacturing, road infrastructure, water infrastructure, data centers, agri-output storage and distribution, defence and aerospace, bunkering, shipping, rail and metro infrastructure, oil exploration, petrochemicals, mass media, green hydrogen, cement, copper, aluminium, and online services.

Subsidiaries 
Notable subsidiaries and jointly-controlled companies of Adani Enterprises include:

Adani Agri Fresh
Adani Agri Fresh is involved in procurement, packaging, logistics and marketing of apples produced by farmers in Himachal Pradesh, as well as and other Indian fruits, under Farm-Pik brand. It also imports fruits from other countries and sells them in the Indian market.

Adani Airport Holdings 

Adani Airport Holdings is the airport management and operations subsidiary. It is the majority stakeholder in Mumbai International Airport Limited (MIAL), which owns the Chhatrapati Shivaji Maharaj International Airport and the under-construction Navi Mumbai International Airport. The company has a 50-year lease on Ahmedabad, Guwahati, Jaipur, Lucknow, Mangalore and Thiruvananthapuram international airports, starting January 2021. It will operate, manage and develop all six airports for 50 years.

Adani Cement
Adani Cement or Adani Cement Industries Limited (ACIL) is a cement company based in Gujarat, India. It was incorporated by Adani Group on June 11, 2021. Adani Cement is wholly-owned subsidiary of Adani Enterprises and has not begun its business operations. It was reported in June 2021 that the Adani Group planned to set up a cement plant in Maharashtra which will have an initial capacity of 5-Million tonnes per annum with an approximate investment of ₹900-1,000 crore. The Group has proposed a 10-million tonnes per annum Lakhpat cement plant, but later put the plans for that plant on hold.

AdaniConneX 

AdaniConneX was launched in 2021 as a 50:50 joint venture with EdgeConneX to develop a network of hyperscale data centers in India, starting with Chennai, Navi Mumbai, Noida, Visakhapatnam and Hyderabad. In 2022, AdaniConneX announced  that it was building a hyperscale data center in Kolkata's Bengal Silicon Valley tech hub.

Adani Defence & Aerospace 

It is a defense manufacturing arm of the company. It manufactures with armed drones such as Hermes 900 UAV and small arms such as IWI Negev, Tavor TAR-21, and IWI ACE. As a part of a joint venture between Elbit Systems from Israel and Adani Defence and Aerospace, a manufacturing facility for unmanned aerial vehicle have been set up at Hyderabad, Telangana, inaugurated in 2019. In April 2020, Adani Defence Systems and Technologies acquired Alpha Design Technologies Pvt Ltd., an organization involved in the design, development, and manufacture of defense electronics and avionics. 

In September 2020, Adani acquired a 51 percent stake in PLR Systems Private Ltd which was incorporated in 2013 and engages in manufacturing and supply of indigenously built defense equipment to the armed forces. In May 2022, Adani Defence Systems and Technologies, a wholly-owned subsidiary of Adani Enterprises, signed a definitive agreement to acquire a 50% stake in Bengaluru-based General Aeronautics. The company is involved with DRDO in Long-range Guided Bomb, VSHORAD, UAV launched Precision Guided Munition (ULPGM) and Rudram-1.

Adani Digital Labs
Adani Digital Labs was incorporated in September 2021 as a wholly-owned subsidiary of Adani Enterprises, to build a digital platform for the consumers of Adani Group's B2C businesses. In December 2022, the company made the alpha release of the mobile app, named "Adani One", with the integration of the group's airport vertical.

Adani Mining 

Adani Enterprises operates its mines in India, Indonesia and Australia, and supplies coal to Bangladesh, China, and some countries in Southeast Asia. It has a coal mine in Bunyu, North Kalimantan, Indonesia, which produced 3.9 Mt of coal in 201617. The Group has made the largest investment by an Indian company in Australia at the controversial Carmichael coal mine in the Galilee Basin, Queensland. Development of this mine is  the subject of a court challenge to the Australian Government over its lack of adherence to environmental legislation.

In 2020, Adani Australia, the controversial Australian mining arm of Adani Enterprises was rebranded as Bravus Mining & Resources. The new subsidiary is responsible for developing Carmichael coal mine in Central Queensland.

Adani New Industries 
Adani New Industries was incorporated in January 2022 as a wholly-owned new energy subsidiary of Adani Enterprises. It undertakes green hydrogen projects such as low-carbon power generation, as well as the manufacture of hydrogen fuel cells, wind turbines, solar modules and batteries. The company announced that it would produce green hydrogen derivatives such as ammonia, methanol and urea. In June 2022, TotalEnergies acquired a 25% stake in Adani New Industries.

Adani Road Transport 

Adani Road Transport undertakes construction, operations and maintenance of roads, highways, expressways and tollways. The company has NHAI projects in the states of Andhra Pradesh, Chhattisgarh, Gujarat, Kerala, Madhya Pradesh, Maharashtra, Odisha, Telangana, and West Bengal.

In December 2021, it won the contract to build a 464 km stretch of the 594 km-long Ganga Expressway in Uttar Pradesh.

Adani Shipping 
Incorporated in 2006, Adani Shipping is a Singapore-based step-down subsidiary which operates a fleet of bulk carriers. In 2011, it began transporting coal from the group's mines in Indonesia and Australia.

Adani Solar 

Adani Solar is the solar PV manufacturing and EPC subsidiary of Adani Enterprises. As of November 2020, it is the largest integrated solar cell and module manufacturer in India.

Adani Water 

It was founded as a subsidiary in December 2018, with a focus on water infrastructure construction. It is currently involved in wastewater treatment, recycle and reuse projects at Prayagraj under the National Mission for Clean Ganga Framework.

Adani Welspun Exploration
Adani Welspun Exploration is a 65:35 joint venture between Adani Group (through Adani Enterprises) and Welspun Enterprises. It is involved in oil and gas exploration.

Adani Wilmar 

Incorporated in 1999, Adani Wilmar is a food processing company and a joint venture between Adani Enterprises and Wilmar International. In November 2000, Adani Wilmar launched its flagship brand "Fortune" under which it produces and sells edible oils including sunflower oil, palm oil, soybean oil, mustard oil, rice bran oil, cottonseed oil, groundnut oil and vanaspati. Apart from edible oils, it sells flour, rice, pulses, sugar, soya nuggets and instant food mixes. The company makes personal care products like soaps, handwash and hand sanitizers under "Alife" brand. It makes industrial use products comprising oleochemicals, castor oil and lecithin.

The company went public in January 2022 with an initial public offering, after which Adani Enterprises and Wilmar International continued to hold a combined 88% stake in Adani Wilmar.

AMG Media Networks
AMG Media Networks was incorporated in April 2022 as a wholly-owned media and publishing subsidiary of Adani Enterprises. In May 2022, AMG Media Networks announced the acquisition of a 49% stake in Quintillion Business Media Ltd, which operates BQ Prime, for an undisclosed amount. Adani Enterprises had previously acquired an unspecified minority stake in the company in March 2022. In August 2022, AMG Media Networks announced the acquisition of a 29.18% stake in NDTV through its subsidiary. In December 2022, it acquired an additional 8.27% stake via a tender offer and 27.26% stake from the promoters Radhika Roy and Prannoy Roy, to raise its total shareholding in NDTV to over 64%.

Kutch Copper
Kutch Copper is a wholly-owned subsidiary of Adani Enterprises which was incorporated in March 2021 to manufacture copper cathodes, copper rods and other copper products. In 2022, the company was reported to be setting up a greenfield copper refinery complex at Mundra with 1 million tonnes per annum (MTPA) capacity, expected to commence production in 2024.

Former subsidiaries
Former subsidiaries Adani Ports & SEZ, Adani Power and Adani Transmission were demerged from Adani Enterprises in 2015. Adani Green Energy and Adani Gas were demerged in 2018.

Investments
In 2021, Adani Enterprises acquired a 20% stake in the online travel company Cleartrip. Adani Enterprises acquired a 49% stake in Maharashtra Border Check Post Network, a subsidiary of the publicly-listed Sadbhav Infrastructure Projects.

Controversies

Opposition to Carmichael mine

The Carmichael coal mine project has faced environmental protests across Australia since the mine was proposed in 2010. The pressure from environmental groups forced international banks and financial institutions to not lend to the project, and resulted in a long delay in securing environmental clearances. In 2018, Adani Group scaled down the mine's capacity and self-financed the project. An indigenous group of the region went to court seeking invalidation of the indigenous land use agreement which was approved by its representatives, but the appeal was dismissed by the Federal Court in 2019. The mine made its first coal shipment in December 2021.

Allegations of stock manipulation 
On 24 January 2023, Hindenburg Research published the findings of a two-year investigation claiming that Adani had engaged in market manipulation and accounting malpractices. Hindenburg also disclosed that it was holding short positions on Adani Group companies. Bonds and shares of companies associated with Adani experienced a decline in value after the accusations. Adani denied the fraud allegations as unfounded and ill-intentioned. On 26 January 2023, Adani Group expressed its intention of taking legal action against Hindenburg.

References

External links
 

Holding companies of India
Holding companies established in 1993
Indian companies established in 1993
Companies listed on the National Stock Exchange of India
Companies listed on the Bombay Stock Exchange